Billy Klippert is a Canadian rock singer-songwriter who rose to fame via the first season of Canadian Idol, in which he finished third.

Career
His self-titled debut album on the Orange Record Label reached 36th spot on Canada's top 100 albums chart in July 2004. His second album Naked & The Simple Truth was released on 3 October 2006, the first single from which was 'Going Under'. In March 2007, Klippert won a Canadian Music Week Indie Award for Favourite Pop Artist of the Year.

Discography

Albums

Singles 

"—" denotes releases that did not chart.

References

External links
 Billy Klippert profile at CTV's Canadian Idol site
 Billy Klippert: Leaving Levon Far Behind?
 Billy Klippert Official Site

Canadian Idol participants
Canadian rock singers
1978 births
Living people
21st-century Canadian male singers